Sernovodsky (masculine), Sernovodskaya (feminine), or Sernovodskoye (neuter) is the name of several rural localities in Russia:
Sernovodskoye, Chechen Republic, a selo in Sunzhensky District of the Chechen Republic
Sernovodskoye, Stavropol Krai, a selo in Kursky District of Stavropol Krai